Coleophora unipunctella is a moth of the family Coleophoridae. It is found from France and Spain to Romania and from Germany, Poland and Lithuania to Italy and Hungary. It is also known from southern Russia. It occurs in forest-steppe.

Adults are on wing in June and July.

The larvae feed on Chenopodium hybridum and Atriplex species. They feed on the generative organs of their host plant.

References

unipunctella
Moths of Europe